Khatuna Gogaladze (born 18 April 1970) is a Georgian politician. Between 2012 and 2014 she was Minister of Environment and Natural Resources Protection in the cabinets of Bidzina Ivanishvili and Irakli Garibashvili.

She has a degree in biology from the Ivane Javakhishvili Tbilisi State University and master's degrees in Public Affairs from Indiana University Bloomington, and in Environmental Sciences and Policy from Central European University, Budapest.

References

External links
 

1970 births
Living people
Government ministers of Georgia (country)
21st-century women politicians from Georgia (country)
21st-century politicians from Georgia (country)
Tbilisi State University alumni
Indiana University alumni
Central European University alumni